Satono Diamond (foaled 30 January 2013) is a Japanese Thoroughbred racehorse. He showed promise as a juvenile in 2015 when he won both of his races. In the following year he developed into a top-class performer winning the Kisaragi Sho finishing third Satsuki Sho and taking second place in the Tokyo Yushun. In the autumn he was unbeaten in three starts, winning the Kobe Shimbun Hai, Kikuka Sho and Arima Kinen and took the JRA Award for Best Three-Year-Old Colt.

Background
Satono Diamond is a bay horse with a diamond-shaped white star bred in Japan by Northern Farm. In 2013 he was consigned as a foal to the JRHA Select sale and was bought for ¥241,500,000 ($2,272,400) by Hajime Satomi. Satomi, whose horses usually carry the "Satono" prefix sent the colt into training with Yasutoshi Ikee. In all of his races in to the end of 2016 Satono Diamond was ridden by the French jockey Christophe Lemaire.

He is from the sixth crop of foals sired by Deep Impact, who was the Japanese Horse of the Year in 2005 and 2006, winning races including the Tokyo Yushun, Tenno Sho, Arima Kinen and Japan Cup. Deep Impact's other progeny include Gentildonna, Harp Star, Kizuna, A Shin Hikari and Makahiki. Satono Diamond is the first foal produced by Malpensa a mare who won three Grade I races in her native Argentina. She was descended from Royal Arch, an Irish mare who was exported to Argentina in the early 1930s.

Racing career

2015: two-year-old season
Satono Diamond made his racecourse debut in contest for previously unraced juveniles over 2000 metres at Kyoto Racecourse on 8 November and won by two lengths from Leukerbad. Racing over the same distance at Hanshin Racecourse on 26 December the colt followed up in a minor event, winning by three lengths from Queen's Best.

2016: three-year-old season

The colt began his 2016 campaign in the Grade 3 Kisaragi Sho (a trial race for the Satsuki Sho) on 7 February over 1800 metres at Kyoto. He started the 1/5 favourite against eight opponents and won by three and a half lengths and a head from Les Planches and Leukerbad. In the Satsuki Sho over 2000 metres at Nakayama Racecourse on 17 April Satono Diamond was made the 1.7/1 favourite ahead of the Japanese champion two-year-old colt Leontes in an eighteen-runner field. Before the race Ikee commented on the colt's physical progress and added "he's very stable mentally and he can handle any kind of race". After racing in mid-division the favourite made a forward move in the straight but was slightly hampered in the closing stages and finished third behind Dee Majesty and Makahiki. Ikee later said that the tactics employed had been "a mistake", commenting "this colt is big and has long limbs and he's not able to take small steps". On 29 May, in front of a 140,000 crowd at Tokyo Racecourse, Satono Diamond was one of eighteen colts to contest the 83rd running of the Tokyo Yushun and started second favourite behind Dee Majesty. He was positioned several lengths behind the early leaders before moving up to dispute the lead in the straight but in a very close finish he was beaten a nose by Makahiki with Dee Majesty half a length away in third place.

After a break of almost four months, Satono Diamond returned to the track in the Kobe Shimbun Hai (a major trial race for the Kikuka Sho) over 2400 metres at Hanshin on 25 September. He started the 1/5 favourite in a fifteen-runner field and won by a neck from the 26/1 outsider Mikki Rocket. Ikee commented "that was his first outing in a while and he was a bit keen and also didn't show his best in the finish either. Still, he won, so that's the important thing." In the 77th running of the Kikuka Sho over 3000 metres at Kyoto on 23 October Satono Diamond started the 1.3/1 favourite in an eighteen-runner field which included Dee Majesty, Mikki Rocket and Air Spinel. He after racing in midfield he moved up on the outside entering the straight, took the lead 200 metres from the finish and quickened clear to win the race by two and a half lengths from the outsider Rainbow Line. After the race Lemaire said "I'm excited and happy to be able to win a classic race for the first time in Japan. The colt was in his best condition and the only concern was the distance. But he responded really well in the last stretch so I was quite confident that we will win. He's a top-class horse and will definitely be able to win other G1 races".

On 25 December Satono Diamond was matched against older opposition when he was one of sixteen horses invited to contest the Arima Kinen over 2500 metres at Nakayama. He was made the 2.6/1 favourite ahead of the four-year-old Kitasan Black and the 2015 winner Gold Actor. The other runners included Sounds of Earth (second in 2015), Cheval Grand (Hanshin Daishoten, Copa Republica Argentina), Marialite (Queen Elizabeth II Cup, Takarazuka Kinen) and Mikki Queen (Yushun Himba, Shuka Sho). Satono Diamond raced in mid-division on the outside as the Maltese Apogee set the pace from Kitasan Black. He moved up to third place entering the straight before producing a late burst of acceleration to overtake Kitasan Black well inside the last 100 metres and win by a neck with Gold Actor half a length away in third place. Lemaire said "He is such an easy ride. He makes my job so easy. He was a little slow to react on the last turn. But he was so strong in front of goal. He has such a big heart", whilst Ikee commented "It's a huge relief. He’ll be able to take it up a notch or two next season. He should really come into his own by the fall. He just beat the best horses in all of Japan as a 3-year-old, which is great and gives us something to look forward to next year."

2017: four-year-old season
Satono Diamond began his 2017 campaign in the Grade 2 Hanshin Daishoten over 3000 metres on 19 March. He started at long odds-on with the only of his nine opponents to start at less than 28/1 being Cheval Grand and the 2014 Tokyo Yushun winner One And Only. He won by one and a half lengths from Cheval Grand with the outsider Tosen Basil taking third place. On 30 April the colt faced a rematch with Kitasan Black in the spring edition of the Tenno Sho over 3200 metres at Kyoto and started 1.5/1 second favourite behind his older rival. He finished third of the seventeen runners, beaten one and a quarter lengths and a neck by Kitasan Black and Cheval Grand.

In August Satono Diamond was sent to France to be prepared for a challenge for the Prix de l'Arc de Triomphe. On his European debut he started second favourite for the Prix Foy over 2400 metres on soft ground at Chantilly Racecourse on 10 September but after briefly taking the lead 300 metres out he faded to finish fifth behind the German challenger Dschingis Secret. In the Prix de l'Arc de Triomphe three weeks later he made no impact and came home fifteenth of the eighteen runners behind Enable.

2018: five-year-old season
On his first run as a five-year-old Satono Diamond finished third to Suave Richard in the Kinko Sho over 2000 metres at Chukyo Racecourse on 11 March. Three weeks later he started third choice in the betting for the Grade 1 Osaka Hai at Hanshin but was "never a threat" and came home seventh behind Suave Richard, beaten six and a quarter lengths by the winner. On 24 June at the same track he was made favourite for the Grade 1 Takarazuka Kinen over 2500 metres. He disputed the lead with the eventual winner Mikki Rocket early in the straight but then faded in the closing stages to finish sixth.

After the summer break Satono Diamond returned on 8 October when he went off the 1.3/1 second choice behind Cheval Grand in the Grade 2 Kyoto Daishoten over 2400 metres. Ridden by Yuga Kawada he settled in mid-division before overtaking the front-running Win Tenderness early in the straight and held off the late run of the filly Red Genova to win by half a length. The horse returned to the highest class for his next race and ran sixth behind Almond Eye in the Japan Cup at Tokyo on 24 November. Satono Diamond ended his season on 23 December with an attempt to repeat his 2017 success in the Arima Kinen and came home sixth of the sixteen runners behind Blast Onepiece.

Stud record
Satono Diamond was retired from racing at the end of the 2018 season and began his career as a breeding stallion at the Shadai Stallion Station.

Assessment and awards
In the JRA Awards for 2016 Satono Diamond was named Best Three-Year-Old Colt a he took 286 of the 291 votes. In the poll to determine the Japanese Horse of the Year he finished third in the voting behind Kitasan Black and Maurice. In the 2016 edition of the World's Best Racehorse Rankings he was given a rating of 123, making him the 12th best racehorse in the world and the third-best three-year-old colt behind Arrogate and Almanzor.

Pedigree

References 

2013 racehorse births
Racehorses bred in Japan
Racehorses trained in Japan
Thoroughbred family 1-w